The Sony Ericsson K810i Cyber-shot is a dual-mode UMTS phone with a 3.2 Megapixel camera with autofocus and 16x digital zoom. It has the full range of mobile entertainment and business features including video telephony, Memory Stick Micro removable storage (up to 8 GB available), picture blogging, full HTML browser, RSS feed support, and music and video players. It is a later iteration of the Sony Ericsson K800i, and both phones have since been succeeded by the Sony Ericsson K850i.

Overview

The 17 mm thin 3G K810i has a 240x320 pixels, QVGA, 262,144 colour display and supports Sony Ericsson Java Platform 7 (JP-7) with a range of JSRs, including Advanced Multimedia Supplements (JSR 234) for enhanced camera and image handling. Mobile Java 3D gaming is supplemented with A/B gaming buttons for landscape mode gaming. K810i is designed after Sony Ericsson K800i, with many similarities with the latter. It is succeeded by Sony Ericsson K850i, the last of the K series phones. K810i is available in 3 colours: Noble Blue, Pulse Red, Golden Ivory.

Specifications
 
 Networks
 GSM/GPRS 900/1800/1900
 Dual-mode UMTS 2100
 Screen
 240x320 pixels 262,144 colour TFT QVGA
 OS
 Sony Ericsson Java Platform 7 (Java ME)
 Internet
 WAP 2.0, XHTML
 Browser: Access Netfront 3.3
 Messaging
 EMS/SMS/MMS
 Email: POP3, IMAP4
 Multimedia Support
 Audio: MP4, MP3, M4A, 3GPP, WAV, MIDI, RealAudio 8, eMelody, iMelody, RHZ, XMF, WMA
 Video: MP4, 3GPP, RealVideo 8, WMV
 Image: JPEG, GIF, BMP, PNG, SVG, WBMP
 Streaming: RTSP (according to 3GPP)
 Local Connectivity
 USB 2.0
 Bluetooth 2.0
 IR

Camera

K810i is Cyber-shot branded and hence includes some of the Cyber-shot features.

 3.2 MP Camera
 Photo fix
 BestPic
 Digital Zoom - up to 16x
 Image stabiliser
 Picture blogging
 Red-eye reduction
 Video stabiliser
 Xenon flash
 Auto focus
 Video recording

There are 2 built-in cameras. For high quality imaging, the main 3.2 MP camera provides the above features. Also, there is horizontal user interface for easier camera handling. The active lens cover and the illuminable camera icons contribute to the intuitive operation of the K810i camera. The phone is also equipped with a VGA video call camera.

Main Features

 Cyber-shot Camera
 PictBridge
 Picture Blogging
 Push Email
 Bluetooth
 PlayNow
 TrackID
 3G Video Calling
 RSS Reader
 Audio/Video Recording
 Web
 FM Radio

Variant

Sony Ericsson K818c, the non-3G version of K810i developed for mainland China

External links
 K810i specifications at Sony Ericsson 
 K810i specifications at Sony Ericsson Developer World
 K810i specifications at Sony Ericsson Developer World
 K810i review at Mobile-review.com

Sony Ericsson K810i
Cyber-shot cameras
Sony Ericsson mobile phones
Mobile phones with infrared transmitter